Fermoy is a town on the River Blackwater in east County Cork, Ireland. As of the 2016 census, the town and environs had a population of approximately 6,500 people. It is located in the barony of Condons and Clangibbon, and is in the Dáil constituency of Cork East.

The town's name comes from the Irish and refers to a Cistercian abbey founded in the 13th century.

History

Ancient
The ringfort at Carntierna up on Corrin hill, 2.4 km (1.5 mi) south of Fermoy, was an important Iron Age site.

Medieval times
A Cistercian abbey was founded in Fermoy in the 13th century. At the dissolution of the monasteries during the Tudor period, the abbey and its lands passed through the following dynasties: Sir Richard Grenville, Robert Boyle and William Forward. However, the site could hardly have been regarded as a town and, by the late 18th century, was little more than a few cabins and an inn.

18th and 19th centuries

In 1791, the lands around Fermoy were bought by a Scotsman, John Anderson. He was an entrepreneur who developed the roads and started the mail coach system in Ireland. He designed the town and the streets remain much the same as they were originally built. In 1984, some of his descendants, living in Australia, named a winery, Fermoy Estate, after the town he established. A plaque and bust in his honour were unveiled at the entrance to the town park in 2001.

Garrison town
Fermoy was the site of Fermoy Barracks, a large British Army barracks, when Ireland was under British rule. In 1797, when the army was looking to establish a new and permanent base, Anderson gave them the land as an inducement to locate in Fermoy. Anderson and the town received economic benefit from the arrangement. In 1806 the first permanent barracks, the East Barracks, were built. They were located on 16 acres of land, and provided accommodation for 112 officers and 1478 men of infantry, and 24 officers, 120 men, and 112 horses of cavalry. A general 130-bed military hospital was also built. In 1809, the West Barracks was built. This also had a 42-bed hospital. When both barracks were complete, there was accommodation for 14 field officers, 169 officers, 2,816 men, and 152 horses. By the 1830s, this was the largest military establishment on the island of Ireland. The town of Fermoy expanded around these facilities and retained its British military facilities until 1922, when the Irish Free State was first established.

20th century

During the Irish War of Independence, Irish Republican Army (IRA) commander Liam Lynch launched an attack using motor vehicles against a group of off-duty King's Shropshire Light Infantry (KSLI) soldiers on September 1919 as they were attending a Wesleyan Church parade in Fermoy. The IRA killed one soldier (a private named Jones), wounded four and disarmed the rest of their weapons. After jurors from Fermoy serving on Jones' coroner inquest refused to return a verdict describing his death as a murder, 200 soldiers from the KSLI launched an unofficial reprisal against businesses owned by the jury, looting several drapery and shoe stores.

Demographics
As of the 2016 census, Fermoy had a population of 6,585. Of these, 72% were white Irish, 1% white Irish travellers, 19% other white ethnicities, 1% were black, 1% Asian, 2% other ethnicities, and 2% did not state their ethnicity. In terms of religion the area is 83% Catholic, 6% other stated religions, 8% have no religion, and 2% not stated.

Geography
Fermoy is situated on the river Blackwater and has steep hills corresponding to the river valley. The downtown area of Fermoy is located in a flood plain and has flooded relatively often in the late 20th and early 21st century. The most expensive flood prevention works ever carried out in Cork were completed in Fermoy in 2015.

The civil parish of Fermoy incorporates the Fermoy Urban electoral division (ED), much of the Fermoy Rural ED, and includes twelve sub-townlands. These include smaller townlands (such as Grange East and Grange West), and larger townlands (like Duntahane).

Economy
Industries in and around the town include chemical production (by Micro Bio), ice-cream manufacturing (by Silver Pail), and power product manufacturing (by Anderson Power). The town's industries also include electronics manufacturing and assembly by Sanmina-SCI Corporation, formerly Space Craft Incorporated.
Moorepark Research Institute, near Fermoy, is one of the Irish state's agricultural and food research institutes.

Education
Local secondary schools include St. Colman's College, Loreto Convent and Coláiste an Chraoibhín. Primary schools include Gaelscoil de hÍde, Presentation Primary School, Bishop Murphy Memorial School, St. Josephs National School and Adair National School.

Tourism

The Blackwater river is one of the town's major attractions and is popular for its salmon and coarse fishing. There is also a river-side walk amenity at Barnane.

Two annual regattas are usually in early May and early September and hosted by Fermoy Rowing Club. Fermoy Rowing Club celebrated its 125th anniversary in 2009, and Fermoy Regatta celebrated its 70th anniversary in the same year.

Fermoy hosted a poetry festival for the first time in 2012.

Transport

For many years the main N8 Cork–Dublin road ran through Fermoy, and the town square was a bottleneck on the route. However, the M8 motorway bypass, which included a new bridge over the Blackwater to the east of the town was opened in late 2006. The former N8 through the town is now a regional road, the R639, and Fermoy's traffic problems have been eased.

The town used to be connected to the Irish railway system, on a line from Mallow to Waterford, with a junction to nearby Mitchelstown through Ballindangan (see Irish railway history). Fermoy railway station opened on 17 May 1860, and finally closed on 27 March 1967.

A number of bus services serve the area, including the Bus Éireann Cork-Dublin and Cork-Clonmel routes, which stop at Fermoy.

Religion
The Christian Brothers, the Presentation and Loreto Sisters and Jehovah’s Witnesses maintain a presence in the town. There is also a Church of Ireland (Anglican) church, Christ Church, and a Presbyterian church.

People

 Patrick Collins (1844–1905), a US Representative from Massachusetts and mayor of Boston, was born near Fermoy.
 Mary Hegarty, Irish operatic soprano
 John Stanislaus Joyce (1849–1931), father of James Joyce, was born in Fermoy.
 John Magnier, owner of Coolmore Stud.
 Noel Mahony (1913-2006), first-class cricketer and president of the Irish Cricket Union.
 James McConnell (1815–1883) was born in Fermoy, and was a founder member of the Institution of Mechanical Engineers.
 Arthur O'Callaghan (1837–1930), Member of Parliament in New Zealand
 Michelle O'Neill, deputy leader of Sinn Féin and deputy First Minister of the Northern Ireland Executive, was born in Fermoy.
 Patrick Rice (1945–2010), a human rights activist, was born in Fermoy.
 Mike Ross, professional rugby union player for Leinster and Ireland, went to school in Fermoy.
 George Throssell (1840–1910), the second premier of Western Australia, was born in Fermoy.
 Una Troy (1910–1993), a novelist and playwright, was born in Fermoy.
 Ted Walsh, jockey and horse trainer, was born in Fermoy.

Film
Some aerial scenes from 1966 war film The Blue Max were filmed near Fermoy, with the nearby Blackwater viaduct featuring on screen.

In the 1980s, a coming-of-age film called 'Clash of the Ash' was shot in Fermoy.

Twin towns

As of 2020, Fermoy is twinned with Ploemeur, in the Brittany region of France. The two towns have had connections since 1982.

From 2006 until 2020, Fermoy was twinned with Nowa Dęba in Poland. When, in early 2020, it was brought to the attention of Fermoy's town council that Nowa Dęba had adopted resolutions against "LGBT ideology" and "propaganda", the council said that they would end the agreement if Nowa Dęba did not reverse its decision to declare itself an "LGBT-free zone". This did not happen, and Fermoy's town council terminated the twinning agreement in October 2020. In January 2021, Nowa Dęba's council voted to revoke the controversial declaration; a decision welcomed by the LGBT community and activists.

Sport
Fermoy GAA, the local Gaelic Athletic Association club, won the Cork Premier Intermediate Football Championship in 2018. The club's grounds, at Páirc Mhic Gearailt, have hosted league and championship games.

Further reading
 Fermoy on the Blackwater, by Bill Power, 2009 (Brigown Press, 410 pages)
 Fermoy: A local history, by Niall Brunicard (first published 1975)
 John Anderson of Fermoy, the forgotten benefactor, by Niall Brunicardi, (first published 1983)
 To die by inches: An account of the Fermoy Poor Law Union during the Great Famine, 1845–1850, by Edward Garner (first published 1986)
 Críchad an Chaoilli: Being the Topography of Ancient Fermoy, by Patrick Power (first published 1932) (University College Cork)
 A sketch of the Blackwater, from Youghal to Fermoy, by Samuel Hayman (first published 1860)
 Fermoy, 1841 to 1890: A local history, by Niall Brunicardi (first published 1978)
 The diary of Wilfrid Saxby Barham, captain "The Buffs," during the great war 1914–1915: Fermoy-Dover-Armentieres-Ypres, by Wilfrid Saxby Barham (first published 1918)
 A sense of Fermoy, by J.J. Bunyan (first published 1983)

See also
 List of abbeys and priories in Ireland (County Cork)
 List of towns and villages in Ireland

References

External links

 Avondhu Heritage Archive, an audiovisual presentation of the heritage sites around Fermoy
 Fermoy Website

Towns and villages in County Cork
Civil parishes of County Cork